Thangmi may refer to:
 Thami, an ethnic group of Nepal
 Thangmi language, a language of Nepal

Language and nationality disambiguation pages